|}

The Fulke Walwyn Kim Muir Challenge Cup is a National Hunt steeplechase in Great Britain for amateur riders; it is open to horses aged five years or older. The chase is run on the New Course at Cheltenham, over a distance of about 3 miles and 2 furlongs (5,230 metres) and, during its running, there are twenty-one fences to be jumped. It is a handicap race and it is scheduled to take place each year during the Cheltenham Festival in March.

The event was established in 1946 and it was originally called the Kim Muir Amateur Riders' Steeplechase. It was introduced by Mrs Evan Williams and was named in memory of her brother, Kim Muir, a cavalry officer who lost his life during World War II. The name of Fulke Walwyn was added to the title in 1991. This was in honour of the highly successful trainer, whose 211 victories at Cheltenham included 40 at the Festival.

Only professional jockeys competed in the 2021 running as amateur riders were excluded from the Cheltenham Festival due to restrictions on grassroots sport for the COVID-19 pandemic in the United Kingdom.

Records
Most successful horse (2 wins):
 Chu-Teh – 1967, 1968
 Glyde Court – 1985, 1986

Leading jockey (4 wins):
 Jamie Codd – Character Building (2009), Junior (2011), The Package (2015), Cause of Causes (2016)

Leading trainer (4 wins):
 Fred Rimell – Mighty Fine (1951), Gay Monarch II (1955), Nicolaus Silver (1961), Double Negative (1977)

Winners
 Weights given in stones and pounds; All amateur jockeys except in 2021.

See also
 Horse racing in Great Britain
 List of British National Hunt races
 Recurring sporting events established in 1946  – this race is included under its original title, Kim Muir Amateur Riders' Steeplechase.

References

 Racing Post:

 pedigreequery.com – Fulke Walwyn Kim Muir Challenge Cup – Cheltenham.
 racenewsonline.co.uk – Racenews Archive (21 February 2008).
 

National Hunt races in Great Britain
Cheltenham Racecourse
National Hunt chases
1946 establishments in England